Sabino Cuadra Lasarte (born 24 May 1949) is a Spanish attorney and politician. He is a member of Amaiur and is a strong supporter of the independence of the Basque Country. He has been a member of the Spanish Congress of Deputies since 2011.

References

1949 births
Amaiur politicians
Living people
Members of the 10th Congress of Deputies (Spain)